Alan Murray McNaughton (born 5 July 1947) is a former New Zealand rugby union player. A flanker, McNaughton represented Bay of Plenty at a provincial level, and was a member of the New Zealand national side, the All Blacks, from 1971 to 1972. He played nine matches for the All Blacks including three internationals.

References

1947 births
Living people
Rugby union players from Christchurch
People educated at Rotorua Boys' High School
New Zealand rugby union players
New Zealand international rugby union players
Bay of Plenty rugby union players
Rugby union flankers